Nongotamba Shutsa "Nosh" A Lody (born 17 July 1989 in Likasi) is a Finnish footballer of Congolese descent currently playing for Finnish Kakkonen club Käpylän Pallo.

References

External links

1989 births
Living people
People from Likasi
Finnish footballers
Finland youth international footballers
Democratic Republic of the Congo footballers
Finnish people of Democratic Republic of the Congo descent
Democratic Republic of the Congo emigrants to Finland
FF Jaro players
Veikkausliiga players
Klubi 04 players
Kotkan Työväen Palloilijat players
Käpylän Pallo players
Association football defenders